Dejan Milić (born 24 January 1984) is a retired Slovenian football goalkeeper. Besides Slovenia, he has played in Cyprus and North Macedonia.

References

External links
PrvaLiga profile 

1984 births
Living people
Footballers from Ljubljana
Slovenian footballers
Association football goalkeepers
NK Svoboda Ljubljana players
NK Krka players
ND Gorica players
NK Primorje players
Slovenian expatriate footballers
Slovenian expatriate sportspeople in Cyprus
Expatriate footballers in Cyprus
Nea Salamis Famagusta FC players
Expatriate footballers in North Macedonia
FK Vardar players
NK Domžale players
Slovenian PrvaLiga players
Cypriot First Division players
Cypriot Second Division players